Lawn bowls at the 1984 Summer Paralympics consisted of eleven events.

Medal summary

References 

 

1984 Summer Paralympics events
1984
Paralympics